Institute for Medical Research, Israel-Canada (IMRIC) is a research institute affiliated with the Faculty of Medicine of the Hebrew University of Jerusalem.

History
The Institute for Medical Research was founded in 2008. It  conducts fundamental and applied research in the field of biomedicine and has five departments: Biochemistry and Molecular Biology; Developmental Biology and Cancer Research; Lautenberg Center for Immunology and Cancer Research; Medical Neurobiology; and Microbiology and Molecular Genetics.

IMRIC also offers a bachelor's degree course in Biomedical Sciences (B.Sc.Med), teaches the basic sciences for the undergraduate, pre-clinical programs of the Hebrew University's Faculty of Medicine and is the largest educational institute in Israel for graduate studies in Biomedical Sciences having about 600 master and doctoral students. The doctoral programs offer a wide range of multidisciplinary research areas in basic medical science and related fields and collaborative programs with clinicians from the Hadassah Medical Center.

The first and founding IMRIC chair was Professor Eitan Yefenof, who oversaw the establishment of the institute and shaped its vision and scope. The second chair was David Lichtstein, from 2008-2012.  Since 2020, the chair of the institute has been Professor Rami Aqeilan who took over from Professor Haya Lorberboum-Galski, the chair from 2012-2020.

IMRIC is supported in part by the Canadian Friends of the Hebrew University (CFHU) through the establishment of scholarships and research funding. In addition, the CFHU aids in creating key collaborative medical research partnerships between Canada and Israel, such as the Alex U. Soyka Pancreatic Cancer Research Project, the Grafstein Network for Cancer Research the Canada-Israel International Fetal Alcohol Consortium and the Joseph and Wolf Lebovic Cancer Genomic and Immunotherapy Program.

IMRIC is also the largest educational institute in Israel for graduate studies in Medical Sciences. In 2016, it had 600 master (MSc) and doctorate (PhD) students.

Departments 
 Biochemistry and Molecular Biology (24 research groups)
 Developmental Biology and Cancer Research (23 research groups)
Lautenberg Center for Immunology and Cancer Research (14 research groups,)  The center was established in 1968 as the first department of Immunology at the Hebrew University-Hadassah Medical School and named after the US senator, Frank Lautenberg.  
Medical Neurobiology (30 research groups)
Microbiology and Molecular Genetics (33 research groups)

Teaching divisions 
The Institute provides a bachelor's degree in Biomedical Sciences. In addition its faculty teaches the basic sciences for the undergraduate, pre-clinical programs of the Faculty of Medicine. These include programs for Medicine,  Military Medicine,  Dentistry, Biomedical Sciences, and Nursing. In 2016, more than 2800 students were enrolled in these programs.

Research hubs and centers 

Research Hubs gather together scientists and clinicians focusing on a specific subject or disease, integrating various scientific and medical disciplines. Each hub consists of researchers from IMRIC, Hadassah Medical Center, The School of Pharmacy, The School of Public Health, Shaare Zedek Medical Center and more. The following research hubs are currently active:

 Epigenetics and Common Human Diseases
 The Tumor and its Microenvironment
 Mitochondria
 Developmental Processes, Malformations and Diseases
 Cardiovascular Research   
 The Herbert and Dorothy Nadolny Cardio-Metabolic Diseases Research Hub
 Microbe Brain Storming - MIBS
 Muscle Degeneration Diseases
 Virus-host Interactions and Viral Pathogenesis.

There are six research centers affiliated with IMRIC: The Lautenberg Center for General and Tumor Immunology; The Kuvin Center for the Study of Infectious and Tropical Diseases; The Brain Disease Research Center - BDRC; The Autism Center; The Hubert H. Humphrey Center for Experimental Medicine and Cancer Research; and The Rogoff Center for Research in Physiology.

Awards and recognition
Israel Prize:  Howard Cedar 1999; Marcel Elkayem 2001; Aharon Razin 2004; Shaul Feldman 2005; Eli Keshet 2021
The EMET Prize for Art, Science and Culture: Moshe Abeles 2004; Eli Keshet 2006; Howard Cedar & Aaron Razin 2009; Baruch Minke 2010; Hanna Engelberg-Kulka 2018; Yinon Ben-Neriah 2019
TEVA Founders Prize: Moshe Abeles 1995; Yehezkel Bernoltz 2000; Yinon Ben-Nerya 2007; Ofer Mandelboim 2008; Orna Amster-Choder 2013; Yehudit Bergman & Eli Keshet 2014
Gairdner Foundation International Award: Howard Cedar & Aaron Razin 2011
Rothschild Prize in Life Sciences: Hagai Bergman 2016
The Rappaport Prize: Yinon Ben-Neriah 2016; Ofer Mandelboim 2020; Yehudit Bergman 2021
Boyalife Science & Science Translational Medicine Award in Stem Cells & Regenerative Medicine: Dr. Yosef Buganim, for his work in stem cells and regenerative medicine.
Kaye Innovation award: Yechezkel Barenholz 1995;  Arie Dagan & Shimon Gatt 2008; Raymond Kaempfer 2013; Noa Kaynan 2013; Ofer Mandelboim 2015; Pinchas Tsukerman 2016; Yuval Dor and Ruth Shemer 2017
Louisa Gross Horwitz Prize (Columbia University) Howard Cedar & Aaron Razin 2016
The Youdim Family Prize for Excellence in Cancer Research: Eli Pikarsky 2013; Rami Aqeilan 2017

Notable faculty 

 Professor, Department of Medical Neurobiology
Howard Cedar, Emeritus Professor, Department of Developmental Biology & Cancer Research
Aharon Razin, Emeritus Professor, Department of Developmental Biology & Cancer Research
Eli Keshet, Professor, Department of Developmental Biology & Cancer Research
Yinon Ben Neriah, Professor, Department of Immunology & Cancer Research
Hanah Margalit, Professor, Department of Microbiology & Molecular Genetics
Ofer Mandelboim, Professor, Department of Immunology & Cancer Research

See also
Higher education in Israel
Healthcare in Israel

References

External links
 IMRIC's Canadian website
 IMRIC's Facebook page
 The Hebrew University of Jerusalem's website
 The Hebrew University's Faculty of Medicine's website

Hebrew University of Jerusalem
Universities and colleges in Jerusalem
Medical schools in Israel
Canada–Israel relations